Viktor Rafaelyevich Dolnik (13 January 1938 – 4 November 2013) was a Russian ornithologist who administered the Rybachy Biological Station for 22 years (from 1967 until 1989). Haemoproteus dolniki is named after him.

Biography
Dolnik was born in Sverdlovsk in 1938. In 1960, he graduated from Leningrad State University. For thirty years, he was the chief of the ornithological station "Rybachy" (literally "Fishers'" - after the village where it was situated). He gained a Candidate of Science degree in 1967, and the Doctor of Science in 1976. He became a professor in 1983.

Dolnik was chief research fellow at Zoological institute of Russian Academy of science. He was the vice-president of the Russian ornithologists' Union, an honorary member of the American ornithological union, and a corresponding member of German and Dutch ornithological unions. He was a recipient of the Medal "For Distinguished Labour" and the Medal "Veteran of Labour"

He died on 4 November 2013.

Works
Dolnik has about two hundred written works. Together with M.A. Kozlov, he was the author of a textbook on zoology for secondary schools. He was best known to the general public for a series of articles concerning human ethology (1980-1990s). These articles later were compiled into a book "Disobedient Child of Biosphere" (1994).

References

Russian ornithologists
2013 deaths
1938 births
Soviet ornithologists